Sant Nirankari Mission is a Nirankari spiritual organisation based in Delhi, India. It was founded in 1929 by Buta Singh. Mata Sudiksha, the daughter of Satguru Baba Hardev Singh, is the sixth spiritual head of the Mission since 17 July 2018.

History
Nirankari Mission had its formal beginning on 25 May 1929, the day when Avtar Singh met Buta Singh. In 1943, Baba Buta Singh passed on his position to Shenshah Baba Avtar Singh. Baba Avtar Singh moved to Delhi after partition, where the "Sant Nirankari Mission" was created in 1948 (in 1947). He was succeeded by his son Gurbachan Singh in 1962.

Baba Gurbachan Singh was assassinated,for his involvement in the Sikh massacre in Amritsar 1978, on 24 April 1980. With Baba Gurbachan Singh's last breath, he appointed his son Hardev Singh was as the next Satguru.

In 2016, Mata Savinder Hardev succeeded her husband Hardev Singh after a fatal accident. In 2018, she declared her daughter Sudiksha Savinder Hardev as the sixth spiritual leader of the organization, days before she succumbed to her deteriorating health.

Baba Buta Singh (1873–1943) 
In 1929, Baba Buta Singh established the Sant Nirankari Mission. Before his death in 1943 at Kohmari, Baba Buta Singh handed over the responsibility of spreading the holy gyan to Shehnshah Baba Avtar Singh.

Shehnshah Baba Avtar Singh (1899–1969) 
Shehnshah Avtar Singh was born on 31 December 1899 in Latifal village of present-day Pakistan. In May 1929 he met Baba Buta Singh. In 1943, Buta Singh named Avtar Singh as successor before his death. 

After the 1947 Indo-Pak partition, Baba Avtar Singh established the Sant Nirankari Mandal in Delhi, India. In 1962, Baba Avtar Singh entrusted it to Baba Gurbachan Singh. Shehnshah Avtar Singh became one with Nirankari on 17 September 1969.

Satguru Baba Gurbachan Singh (1930–1980) 
Gurbachan Singh was born on 10 December 1930 to Baba Avtar Singh and Mata Budhwanti Kaur, in Peshawar, a city in present-day Pakistan. He was married to Kulwant Kaur (Nirankari Raj Mata).

Baba Gurbachan Singh took over the organization in 1962. Following a clash with Sikhs, he was assassinated, for his involvement in the Sikh massacre, in April of 1980.

Satguru Baba Hardev Singh (1954–2016) 
Hardev Singh was born on 23 February 1954 in Delhi to Baba Gurbachan Singh and Nirankari Raj Mata Kulwant Kaur as parents. After the cold blooded assassination of Baba Gurbachan Singh in 1980, he became the next Satguru. He was honored by the United Nations (U.N.O.) with special consultative status in 2012, which was later upgraded to general consultative status in 2018.

He died on 13 May 2016 in an automobile accident, when he was travelling to attend a spiritual gathering in Canada with both of his son-in-laws. One of them succumbed to his injuries. The other son in law was driving the vehicle when the accident occurred. Details are still vague around the exact cause of the accident.

Satguru Mata Savinder Hardev (1957–2018) 
Savinder Hardev was born on 12 January 1957. She was the wife of Hardev Singh. After the death of her husband, she became the fifth head of the organization.

Before her death, she handed over the organization to her daughter Sudiksha. She died on 5 August 2018

Satguru Mata Sudiksha Savinder Hardev (1985) 
Sudiksha was born on 13 March 1985. She was named as the Satguru of the Nirankari Mission on 17 July 2018. 

She is now the sixth head of the Nirankari Mission.

Beliefs

The organization teaches "self-realization through God-realization". Being born as a human being through the cycles of reincarnation has been described as superior to all other species of animal created by God. Nirankaris believe that it is "meaningless to worship" until one has a sight of God. Simply repeating the word "water" does not quench your thirst. One must experience "water" and consume it in order to truly quench your thirst. It focuses on the FACT that God is formless yet exists in all forms.

Nirankari Museum
The Nirankari Museum was inaugurated by fourth satguru of the Mission, Satguru Baba Hardev Singh , on 22 February 2005. The museum is located within the Nirankari Sarovar Complex in New Delhi. It depicts the history and key teachings of the Mission through audio-visuals and pictures.

References

External links

Foundation website

Organizations established in 1929
Religious organisations based in India
Spiritual organizations
1929 establishments in India